Yoon Won-il (born March 31, 1983) is a South Korean football player who currently plays for Pohang Steelers in the K-League. He also played for Suwon Samsung Bluewings, Daegu FC and Incheon United.

External links 

1983 births
Living people
South Korean footballers
Suwon Samsung Bluewings players
Daegu FC players
Incheon United FC players
Pohang Steelers players
K League 1 players
Association football midfielders
People from Pohang
Sportspeople from North Gyeongsang Province